Suburban Noize Presents: Sounds of Things to Come is an official compilation album by Suburban Noize Records released on April 20, 2000. This album includes popular names of the label, such as the Kottonmouth Kings, Dogboy, and Saint Dog along with others.

Track listing

References

2000 compilation albums
Suburban Noize Records compilation albums